The 2012 Toronto FC season was the sixth season in Toronto FC's existence. The club missed the playoffs for the sixth consecutive season, having never made a post-season appearance. Their season began on March 7 with the quarterfinal of the Champions League against the Los Angeles Galaxy.  They ultimately reached the semi-finals of the tournament where they lost to Mexican side Santos Laguna.

Review and events

Season
Toronto FC started the 2012 Major League Soccer season with a nine-game losing streak; a new league record. Aron Winter was dismissed as head coach and was replaced by Paul Mariner. Winter had only won one away match during his tenure as head coach. Mariner became the 7th coach in franchise history. Prior to Winter dismissal, he agreed to take over the youth academy and Mariner would become head coach. However, the night before the changes were to be announced, he asked to be relieved of all duties. Toronto FC failed to qualify the 2012 MLS Cup Playoffs. Torsten Frings suffered a hip injury late in the season and missed the remainder of the season, ending his Toronto FC career.

On September 27, Toronto FC stated on their Facebook page that, "waiving ticketing fees" for the remaining home games between 10 a.m. on the morning of September 27 and 10 a.m. on September 29. Many season-ticket holders were angry over the discount. Paul Beirne, senior director of business operations, stated "it's the cumulative effect of a really difficult season."

On October 6 against D.C. United, some people in the supporters section wore paper bags over their heads.

Olof Mellberg

Paul Mariner showed interest in Olof Mellberg after watching Sweden vs. England at Euro 2012. The club pursued the player and agreed to a deal worth $3 million over two years was agreed to in principle. However, the league refuse to let the deal happen. The club was furious the league had decided to not let the Bosman transfer to happen. Major League Soccer claims that they went to the MLSE board of directors and try to convince them not to sign Mellberg. MLS commissioner Don Garber stated "Let's put Mellberg aside. The league hasn't nixed that. Toronto has decided it didn't make sense for them." A source that the Toronto Star says that would know of the situation stated that Garber's statement was "absolutely untrue. Not 99 per cent untrue. It's 100 per cent untrue." A rumour circulated within the club that "the league had polled other teams for their thoughts on the deal."

Competitions

Pre-season

MLS regular season

Match results

Eastern Conference table

Overall league table

Results summary

Results by round

Canadian Championship

2011–12 CONCACAF Champions League

2012–13 CONCACAF Champions League

Mid-season friendly

Overall

Overall record and club statistics
{|class="wikitable"
|-
|Games played || 46 (34 Major League Soccer, 4 Canadian Championship, 8 CONCACAF Champions League)
|-
|Games won || 10 (5 Major League Soccer, 2 Canadian Championship, 3 CONCACAF Champions League)
|-
|Games drawn || 12 (8 Major League Soccer, 2 Canadian Championship, 2 CONCACAF Champions League)
|-
|Games lost || 24 (21 Major League Soccer, 3 CONCACAF Champions League)
|-
|Goals scored || 56 (36 Major League Soccer, 4 Canadian Championship, 16 CONCACAF Champions League)
|-
|Goals conceded || 78 (62 Major League Soccer, 1 Canadian Championship, 15 CONCACAF Champions League)
|-
|Goal difference || -22 (-26 Major League Soccer, 3 Canadian Championship, 1 CONCACAF Champions League)
|-
|Clean sheets || 8
|-
|Yellow cards || 76
|-
|Red cards || 4
|-
|Worst discipline ||  Logan Emory  (1 , 1 )
|-
|Best result(s) || W 5 – 1 (H) v Águila – CONCACAF Champions League – August 1, 2012
|-
|Worst result(s) || L 2 – 6 (A) v Santos Laguna – CONCACAF Champions League – April 4, 2012
|-
|Most appearances ||  Ryan Johnson with 43 appearances
|-
|Top scorer(s) ||  Ryan Johnson (12 goals)
|-
|Points || Overall: 42/138 (30.43%)
|-

Overall record by competition

Squad information

Squad and statistics

Squad, appearances and goals

|-
|colspan="14"|Players who left the club during the season: (Statistics shown are the appearances made and goals scored while at Toronto FC)

Top scorers
Includes all competitive matches. The list is sorted by shirt number when total goals are equal.

{| class="wikitable" style="font-size: 95%; text-align: center;"
|-
!width=15|
!width=15|
!width=15|
!width=150|Nationality
!width=150|Name
!width=80|Major League Soccer
!width=80|Canadian Championship
!width=80|2011-12 Champions League
!width=80|2012-13 Champions League
!width=80|Total
|-
|1
|9
|FW
|
|Ryan Johnson
|6
|2
|2
|1
|11
|-
|2
|14
|FW
|
|Danny Koevermans
|9
|0
|0
|0
|9
|-
|rowspan=2|3
|11
|MF
|
|Luis Silva
|4
|0
|1
|1
|6
|-
|19
|MF
|
|Reggie Lambe
|2
|2
|0
|2
|6
|-
|5
|23
|MF
|
|Terry Dunfield
|2
|0
|0
|1
|3
|-
|rowspan=2|6
|7
|FW
|
|Joao Plata
|0
|0
|2
|0
|2
|-
|22
|MF
|
|Torsten Frings
|2
|0
|0
|0
|2
|-
|rowspan=8|8
|3
|DF
|
|Miguel Aceval
|0
|0
|1
|0
|1
|-
|4
|DF
|
|Doneil Henry
|1
|0
|0
|0
|1
|-
|8
|MF
|
|Eric Avila
|1
|0
|0
|0
|1
|-
|18
|FW
|
|Quincy Amarikwa
|1
|0
|0
|0
|1
|-
|18
|FW
|
|Nick Soolsma
|0
|0
|1
|0
|1
|-
|25
|DF
|
|Jeremy Hall
|1
|0
|0
|0
|1
|-
|29
|FW
|
|Eric Hassli
|1
|0
|0
|0
|1
|-
|32
|FW
|
|Andrew Wiedeman
|1
|0
|0
|0
|1
|-
|colspan="4"|
|TOTALS
|30
|4
|7
|6
|47

Top assists
Includes all competitive matches. The list is sorted by shirt number when total goals are equal.

{| class="wikitable" style="font-size: 95%; text-align: center;"
|-
!width=15|
!width=15|
!width=15|
!width=150|Nationality
!width=150|Name
!width=80|Major League Soccer
!width=80|Canadian Championship
!width=80|2011-12 Champions League
!width=80|2012-13 Champions League
!width=80|Total
|-
|1
|5
|DF
|
|Ashtone Morgan
|5
|0
|0
|2
|7
|-
|2
|9
|FW
|
|Ryan Johnson
|4
|1
|1
|0
|6
|-
|3
|18
|FW
|
|Nick Soolsma
|2
|1
|2
|0
|5
|-
|rowspan=3|4
|6
|MF
|
|Julian de Guzman
|3
|1
|0
|0
|4
|-
|8
|MF
|
|Luis Silva
|2
|0
|0
|2
|4
|-
|22
|MF
|
|Torsten Frings
|2
|0
|1
|1
|4
|-
|rowspan=6|7
|3
|DF
|
|Miguel Aceval
|2
|0
|0
|0
|2
|-
|8
|MF
|
|Eric Avila
|2
|0
|0
|0
|2
|-
|14
|FW
|
|Danny Koevermans
|2
|0
|0
|0
|2
|-
|19
|MF
|
|Reggie Lambe
|1
|1
|0
|0
|2
|-
|27
|DF
|
|Richard Eckersley
|2
|0
|0
|0
|2
|-
|29
|FW
|
|Eric Hassli
|2
|0
|0
|0
|2
|-
|rowspan=5|13
|4
|DF
|
|Doneil Henry
|1
|0
|0
|0
|1
|-
|15
|MF
|
|Matt Stinson
|1
|0
|0
|0
|1
|-
|18
|FW
|
|Quincy Amarikwa
|1
|0
|0
|0
|1
|-
|25
|DF
|
|Jeremy Hall
|1
|0
|0
|0
|1
|-
|48
|DF
|
|Darren O'Dea
|1
|0
|0
|0
|1
|-
|colspan="4"|
|TOTALS
|34
|4
|4
|5
|47

Clean sheets
Includes all competitive matches. The list is sorted by shirt number when total clean sheets are equal.

{| class="wikitable" style="font-size: 95%; text-align: center;"
|-
!width=15|
!width=15|
!width=15|
!width=150|Nationality
!width=150|Name
!width=80|Major League Soccer
!width=80|Canadian Championship
!width=80|2011-12 Champions League
!width=80|2012-13 Champions League
!width=80|Total
|-
|1
|30
|GK
|
|Miloš Kocić
|3
|3
|0
|0
|6
|-
|rowspan="3"|2
|24
|GK
|
|Stefan Frei
|0
|0
|0
|0
|0
|-
|40
|GK
|
|Quillan Roberts
|0
|0
|0
|0
|0
|-
|41
|GK
|
|Freddy Hall
|0
|0
|0
|0
|0
|-
|colspan="4"|
|TOTALS
|2
|3
|0
|0
|5

Disciplinary record
Includes all competitive matches. The list is sorted by shirt number when total cards are equal.

{| class="wikitable" style="font-size: 95%; text-align: center;"
|-
| rowspan="2"  style="width:2.5%; text-align:center;"|
| rowspan="2"  style="width:3%; text-align:center;"|
| rowspan="2"  style="width:3%; text-align:center;"|
| rowspan="2"  style="width:3%; text-align:center;"|
| rowspan="2"  style="width:12%; text-align:center;"|Name
| colspan="3" style="text-align:center;"|Major League Soccer
| colspan="3" style="text-align:center;"|Canadian Championship
| colspan="3" style="text-align:center;"|2011-12 Champions League
| colspan="3" style="text-align:center;"|2012-13 Champions League
| colspan="3" style="text-align:center;"|Total
|-
!  style="width:25px; background:#fe9;"|
!  style="width:28px; background:#ff8888;"|
!  style="width:25px; background:#ff8888;"|
!  style="width:25px; background:#fe9;"|
!  style="width:28px; background:#ff8888;"|
!  style="width:25px; background:#ff8888;"|
!  style="width:25px; background:#fe9;"|
!  style="width:28px; background:#ff8888;"|
!  style="width:25px; background:#ff8888;"|
!  style="width:35px; background:#fe9;"|
!  style="width:35px; background:#ff8888;"|
!  style="width:35px; background:#ff8888;"|
!  style="width:35px; background:#fe9;"|
!  style="width:35px; background:#ff8888;"|
!  style="width:35px; background:#ff8888;"|
|-
|1
|2
|DF
|
|Logan Emory
|0
|1
|1
|0
|0
|0
|0
|0
|0
|0
|0
|0
|0
|1
|1
|-
|2
|27
||DF
|
|Richard Eckersley
|4
|0
|0
|0
|0
|1
|1
|0
|0
|0
|0
|0
|5
|0
|1
|-
|3
|6
|MF
|
|Julian de Guzman
|4
|0
|0
|0
|0
|1
|0
|0
|0
|0
|0
|0
|4
|0
|1
|-
|rowspan=2|4
|22
||MF
|
|Torsten Frings
|5
|0
|0
|1
|0
|0
|1
|0
|0
|0
|0
|0
|7
|0
|0
|-
|23
|MF
|
|Terry Dunfield
|5
|0
|0
|1
|0
|0
|0
|0
|0
|1
|0
|0
|7
|0
|0
|-
|6
|5
||DF
|
|Ashtone Morgan
|5
|0
|0
|1
|0
|0
|0
|0
|0
|0
|0
|0
|6
|0
|0
|-
|rowspan=4|7
|4
||DF
|
|Doneil Henry
|3
|0
|0
|1
|0
|0
|0
|0
|0
|0
|0
|0
|4
|0
|0
|-
|9
|FW
|
|Ryan Johnson
|4
|0
|0
|0
|0
|0
|0
|0
|0
|0
|0
|0
|4
|0
|0
|-
|14
|FW
|
|Danny Koevermans
|2
|0
|0
|0
|0
|0
|2
|0
|0
|0
|0
|0
|4
|0
|0
|-
|19
|MF
|
|Reggie Lambe
|3
|0
|0
|1
|0
|0
|0
|0
|0
|0
|0
|0
|4
|0
|0
|-
|rowspan=4|11
|3
|DF
|
|Miguel Aceval
|0
|0
|0
|0
|0
|0
|2
|0
|0
|0
|0
|0
|2
|0
|0
|-
|11
|MF
|
|Luis Silva
|1
|0
|0
|1
|0
|0
|0
|0
|0
|0
|0
|0
|2
|0
|0
|-
|12
|DF
|
|Adrian Cann
|1
|0
|0
|1
|0
|0
|0
|0
|0
|0
|0
|0
|2
|0
|0
|-
|48
|DF
|
|Darren O'Dea
|1
|0
|0
|0
|0
|0
|0
|0
|0
|1
|0
|0
|2
|0
|0
|-
|rowspan=6|15
|20
|DF
|
|Ty Harden
|1
|0
|0
|0
|0
|0
|0
|0
|0
|0
|0
|0
|1
|0
|0
|-
|21
|DF
|
|Aaron Maund
|1
|0
|0
|0
|0
|0
|0
|0
|0
|0
|0
|0
|1
|0
|0
|-
|24
||GK
|
|Stefan Frei
|0
|0
|0
|0
|0
|0
|1
|0
|0
|0
|0
|0
|1
|0
|0
|-
|25
|DF
|
|Jeremy Hall
|0
|0
|0
|1
|0
|0
|0
|0
|0
|0
|0
|0
|1
|0
|0
|-
|29
|FW
|
|Eric Hassli
|1
|0
|0
|0
|0
|0
|0
|0
|0
|0
|0
|0
|1
|0
|0
|-
|32
|FW
|
|Andrew Wiedeman
|0
|0
|0
|0
|0
|0
|0
|0
|0
|1
|0
|0
|1
|0
|0
|-
|colspan="4"|
|TOTALS
|41
|1
|1
|8
|0
|2
|7
|0
|0
|3
|0
|0
|60
|1
|3
|-

Player movement

Transfers

In

Out

Loans

Out

Recognition

MLS Player of the Week

MLS Goal of the Week

MLS Team of the Week

Miscellany

Allocation ranking 
Toronto is in the No. 4 position in the MLS Allocation Ranking. The allocation ranking is the mechanism used to determine which MLS club has first priority to acquire a U.S. National Team player who signs with MLS after playing abroad, or a former MLS player who returns to the league after having gone to a club abroad for a transfer fee. A ranking can be traded, provided that part of the compensation received in return is another club's ranking.

International roster slots 
It is believed that Toronto FC has 10 MLS International Roster Slots. Each club in Major League Soccer is allocated 8 international roster spots, which can be traded. Toronto FC acquired one slot from San Jose Earthquakes on July 14, 2011. TFC has use of this spot through the end of the 2012 season, at which point it reverts to San Jose. Earlier, Toronto FC had acquired an additional spot from San Jose on July 14, 2008 for use through the end of the 2013 season.

Future draft pick trades

Club

Management team

First team staff

Footnotes 
: These trades included "future considerations", which may or may not include draft picks.

References

Toronto FC seasons
Tor